James Colvin (1844 – 29 October 1919) was a New Zealand Member of Parliament for , in the South Island.

Early life
Colvin was born in 1844 in Donegal, Ireland, where he received his education. He emigrated to Victoria, Australia in 1861 and went gold mining in Creswick and Daylesford. He came to New Zealand in 1862 and joined the Otago Gold Rush in Dunstan and Wakatipu, from where he went to the gold fields in the Wakamarina Valley in Marlborough; he set up a store in the latter place. When he was a young man, Colvin was held up by a member of the Burgess-Sullivan gang (also known as the Maungatapu Murderers) near where George Dobson had been murdered a few days previously. Unknown to his interrogator James Colvin was carrying 2,000 pounds worth of gold on his saddle, and managed to pass unmolested.

Political career

He served on numerous boards and committees: the Buller County Council (1885–89), Westport Harbour Board (Chairman 1890), and was mayor of Westport between 1898 and 1900.

Colvin stood in the  electorate in the  but was defeated by Patrick O'Regan. He defeated O'Regan in 1899 as a supporter of Richard Seddon, and represented the Buller electorate in the House of Representatives for twenty years until his death in 1919.

From 1906 until 1909 he was the Liberal Party's junior whip.

Colvin served as the Chairman of Committees from 1910 to 1911. In the house, he had the nickname 'uncle Colvin', given to him by Thomas Wilford in 1899 when they both entered Parliament. He was Minister of Mines in 1912 in the Mackenzie cabinet.

Colvin was killed at 10 pm on 29 October 1919 by a tram as he left Parliament House. Parliament was still sitting, and the news reached the debating chamber within 15 minutes, which resulted in the immediate adjournment of proceedings.

Notes

References

|-

New Zealand Liberal Party MPs
Independent MPs of New Zealand
Members of the Cabinet of New Zealand
Mayors of Westport, New Zealand
New Zealand gold prospectors
New Zealand businesspeople
New Zealand businesspeople in retailing
Irish emigrants to New Zealand (before 1923)
Politicians from County Donegal
1844 births
1919 deaths
Unsuccessful candidates in the 1896 New Zealand general election
Members of the New Zealand House of Representatives
New Zealand MPs for South Island electorates
19th-century New Zealand politicians
People of the West Coast Gold Rush
Accidental deaths in New Zealand